Sancho VII (11577 April 1234) called the Strong was King of Navarre from 1194 until his death in 1234. He was the son and heir of Sancho VI, whom he followed as the second king to hold the title of King of Navarre. Sancho VII was the first to use the chains of Navarre as his blazon, a symbol that later would become the main one of Navarre, and the last member of the Jiménez dynasty, which had ruled since the 9th century.

Youth 
Sancho was probably the eldest child of Sancho VI and Sancha, daughter of Alfonso VII of León, born soon after their marriage, probably in Tudela, their usual residence.

Sancho's younger sister Berengaria was married to Richard I of England in 1191 on the island of Cyprus on the way to the Holy Land for the Third Crusade. Sancho and Richard were reputed to have been good friends and close allies, even before the marriage brought them together. The French took advantage of Richard's captivity in Germany and captured certain key fortresses of the Plantagenet dominions including Loches. When Richard returned to his continental lands in 1194, the knights of Sancho were besieging the castle for him. As soon as Richard arrived though, Sancho was forced to return to Navarre at the news of the death of his father. He was crowned in Pamplona on 15 August.

Reign 

Sancho arrived late at the Battle of Alarcos in 1195 and thus ruined good relations with Alfonso VIII of Castile.  The ensuing confrontation resulted in Sancho devastating Soria and Almazán and Alfonso accepted the Peace of Tarazona.

Sancho made expeditions against Murcia and Andalusia, and, between 1198 and 1200, he campaigned in Africa, probably in the service of the Almohads, whose help he wanted against Castile. Taking advantage of his absence, Alfonso VIII of Castile and Peter II of Aragon invaded Navarre, which lost the provinces of Álava, Guipúzcoa, and Biscay to Castile.  These conquests were subsequently confirmed by the Treaty of Guadalajara (1207).

Sancho's leadership was decisive in the Battle of Las Navas de Tolosa in the year 1212. In that engagement, the Christian forces of Sancho, Alfonso, Afonso II of Portugal, and Peter II of Aragón allied to defeat the forces of the Almohad Caliph Muhammad an-Nasir.  Sancho's troops cut the chains guarding the tent and Slavic guards ring of the Miramamolín, supreme commander of the Al-Andalusian Forces.  For this, it is believed the chains became the symbol of Navarre and replaced the sable eagle on a golden field with a golden chain on a gules field in the Navarrese coat of arms. But others suspect they represented the Basques' star-like Sun of Death seen on their Hilarri (Basques' Stelae) or houses traditionally for protection, and perhaps painted on their shields too with the same religious purpose, meaning of Life or Death, or the new Imagery used for Jesus or Christianity as for others were the Christi Anagram or plain Cross on the shield.

Sancho's relations with the countries north of the Pyrenees were notably better than his Castilian ones.  Several Pyrenean counties declared themselves his vassals and he concluded treaties with John, King of England, and the various Aragonese kings of his time, the aforementioned Peter II and James I.  With the latter he signed at Tudela, in 1231, which was never finished, a treaty stating that whoever survived the other would inherit unopposed the other's kingdom.

Sancho continued the construction of a new cathedral in Pamplona, as begun by his father and to be finished by his successor. The construction of a certain Gothic bridge over the Ebro in Tudela has also been attributed to him.

Succession 

Sancho VII was married twice. His first wife was Constance, daughter of Raymond VI of Toulouse and Beatrice of Béziers, whom he married in 1195. He repudiated her a few years later. The identity of his second wife is disputed; some sources mention her as Clemence, daughter of Frederick I, Holy Roman Emperor, while other sources claim she was the daughter of Yusuf II, an emir from Morocco. Sancho VII had no known children by either wife. According to Charles of Viana, however, he had a son with his second wife, who died in an accident when he was 15 years old.

As the result of prolonged and painful illness, starting with a varicose ulcer on his right leg and ashamed of it and his consequent obesity, Sancho went into retirement at Tudela at some point, when his youngest sister Blanche came from Champagne and took administration of the kingdom until she died in 1229. His eldest sister, Berengaria, Queen of England, died in 1230, thus leaving Sancho alone among the children of Sancho VI. When he died in his castle at Tudela, probably of complications related to the varicose ulcer in his leg, his only nephew and Blanche's son Theobald IV of Champagne was recognized as his successor.

Legacy 

According to Alberic de Trois-Fontaines, Sancho left a large library, although the number of 1.7 million books is clearly exaggerated. The cultural contacts with the Muslim Kingdoms that he visited and battled with, his friendship with his brother-in-law King Richard, and his sister Blanche's court of Troyes, at the time the most refined in Europe, must have left an important influence on the King's personal intellect, bringing to him an advantageous outlook from the one well set already by their father at his youth, full however with peccadilloes and other impetuous extravaganza.

Sancho left the kingdom with a wealthy treasury and improved communications was in his day one of the most advanced in human rights, and its Jewish community enjoyed the best standing in Christian Europe, which after all had been the work and result of the Jimenez royal house for centuries. He was originally interred in the church of San Nicolás, but was later moved to Roncesvalles after much resistance from the local Clergy. His remains have since been exhumed for study and examined by the physician Luis del Campo, also the king's biographer, who measured him at 2.20 metres tall (7'3" feet), probably the basis for his "strength" alias.

Notes

External links

Sancho VII "El Fuerte".
Catholic Encyclopedia article on Navarre.
 The arms of the kings of Navarre
  Medieval History of Navarre

1150s births
1234 deaths
12th-century Navarrese monarchs
13th-century Navarrese monarchs